Please add names of notable painters with a Wikipedia page, in precise English alphabetical order, using U.S. spelling conventions. Country and regional names refer to where painters worked for long periods, not to personal allegiances.

Ike no Taiga (池大雅, 1723–1776) Japanese painter and calligrapher
Leiko Ikemura (born 1951), Japanese-Swiss painter and sculptor
Jörg Immendorff (1945–2007), German painter, sculptor and stage designer
David Imms (born 1945), English artist and painter
Domenico Induno (1815–1878), Italian painter
Rudolph F. Ingerle (1879–1950), American landscape painter
John Stuart Ingle (1933–2010 ), American artist
Jean Auguste Dominique Ingres (1780–1867), French painter
George Inness (1829–1894), American landscape painter
James Dickson Innes (1887–1914), Welsh/English painter
INO (living), Greek visual artist
Inoue Naohisa (井上直久, born 1948), fantasy artist
Dahlov Ipcar (1917–2017), American painter, illustrator and author
Albert Irvin (1922–2015), English abstract artist
Vincenzo Irolli (1860–1949), Italian painter.
Wilson Irvine (1869–1936), American landscape painter
Eugène Isabey (1803–1886), French painter, draftsman, and printmaker
Rolf Iseli (born 1934), Swiss painter
Adriaen Isenbrant (1490?–1551), Flemish Northern Renaissance painter
Kinichiro Ishikawa (石川欽一郎, 1871–1945), Japanese painter
Jozef Israëls (1824–1911), Dutch oil and watercolor painter and etcher
Itagaki Yoshio (板垣由雄, born 1967), Japanese artist and photographer
Itō Jakuchū (伊藤若冲, 1716–1800), Japanese painter
Itō Ogura Yonesuke (1870–1940), Japanese/American artist
Itō Seiu (伊藤晴雨, 1882–1961), Japanese kinbaku painter
Itō Shinsui (伊東深水, 1898–1972), Japanese painter and woodblock printer
Johannes Itten (1888–1967), Swiss painter, writer and theorist
Alexander Ivanov (1806–1858), Russian painter
Béla Iványi-Grünwald (1867–1940), Hungarian painter
Oton Iveković (1869–1939), Austro-Hungarian/Yugoslav (Croatian) painter
Iwasa Matabei (岩佐又兵衛, 1578–1650), Japanese artist

References
References can be found under each entry.

I